Dark Continent may refer to:
A phrase to describe Africa, particularly Sub-Saharan Africa
A phrase used in 1926 by Sigmund Freud to describe the sexual life of adult women
 Busch Gardens: The Dark Continent, a former name of Busch Gardens Tampa Bay
Dark Continent (album), an album by Wall of Voodoo
Dark Continent: Adventure & Exploration in Darkest Africa, a role-playing game published in 2000 by New Breed; see Timeline of tabletop role-playing games
Dark Continent: Europe's Twentieth Century, a book on 20th-century European history by Mark Mazower
Monsters: Dark Continent, British independent science fiction monster film